Charlotte de Lannoy (d. September 1626) was a French court official. She served as Première dame d'honneur to the queen of France, Anne of Austria, from 1624 until 1626.

Life
Charlotte de Lannoy was the daughter of Christophe, seigneur de Lannoy, gouverneur de Montreuil. 

She was appointed to the head of queen Anne's household by Cardinal de Richelieu, to whom she was loyal, and her appointment was therefore not well seen by the queen.   de Lannoy, who was described as a "respectable matron", was in service during the famous incident during the journey of the court to the coast in 1625, when the queen was famously courted by George Villiers, 1st Duke of Buckingham, a courtship which de Lannoy attempted to prevent and left a report on to the king.

References 

1626 deaths
17th-century French people
French ladies-in-waiting
Court of Louis XIII
Household of Anne of Austria